Ambalaseri is a village in Tuticorin District in the southern region of Tamil Nadu  India. The village has a population of roughly 1500 people.

Economy 

Rice, dal, peanuts and bananas are the main agricultural products.

References

Thoothukudi
Villages in Thoothukudi district